Ken Lucas (August 20, 1940 – August 6, 2014) was an American professional wrestler who won many tag and singles championships in the southern US National Wrestling Alliance territories between 1960 and 1985, before finishing his career as a jobber in the American Wrestling Association. He trained Ricky Morton to wrestle, and they teamed often in the early 1980s, winning three championships six times. He was from Mesa, Arizona and died at his home in Pensacola, Florida.

Career

National Wrestling Alliance (1960–1984)

Tucson (1960–1964)
Ken Lucas began his career in 1960 for Monte LaDue's territory in Tucson, Arizona. In May 1962, he won his first title, the NWA Western States Tag Team Championship, with "Iron" Mike DiBiase. He would win two more with Hans Steiner in 1963, before leaving the Tucson area in 1964. During his time in Tucson, he also made stops in Pittsburgh, Hawaii, and Denver.

Texas (1963–1965, 1977)
During his last days in Tucson in 1963, Lucas made a stop in Amarillo, working for Dory Funk, Sr. He remained in the area until 1965. He would also wrestle briefly in Fort Worth. He wouldn't return to the area until 1977.

Tri-State (1964–1979)
In 1964, Lucas went to the Tri-State area of Louisiana, Mississippi, and Oklahoma, working for Leroy McGuirk. He spent fifteen years in the area, before Bill Watts took the reins in 1979. During his tenure there, Lucas held two NWA Louisiana Heavyweight Championships and four NWA Mississippi Heavyweight Championships, among other titles.

Gulf Coast (1964–1984)
Lucas went to the Gulf Coast area in 1964, and competed in the area, on and off, for over two decades. During that time, he would hold eleven NWA Gulf Coast Heavyweight Championships, fifteen NWA Gulf Coast Tag Team Championships with eleven different partners, five NWA Alabama Heavyweight Championships, two NWA City of Mobile Heavyweight Championships, and two NWA United States Junior Heavyweight Championships, among other titles.

Georgia (1965–1966, 1969)
Lucas went down to Georgia Championship Wrestling in 1965. He would spend two years in the area, before leaving in 1967. He would briefly return to the area in 1969.

Mid-America (1968–1981)
Lucas joined the Mid-America area ran by Nick Gulas in 1968. When Jerry Jarrett broke away from Gulas to form the Championship Wrestling Association in Memphis, he went back and forth between Nashville and Memphis for three years until Gulas's promotion closed in 1980. He won several Tag Team Championships within the area and one NWA Mid-America Heavyweight Championship.

Florida (1976)
Lucas made a stop in Florida in 1976, working for Championship Wrestling from Florida. While there, he held two Tag Team titles with Mike Graham.

Central States (1978)
Lucas made a brief stop in the Central States area in Kansas City in 1978. While there, he held one Heavyweight Championship and one Tag Team Championship with Kevin Sullivan.

Southwest Championship Wrestling (1982–1984)
After wrestling for the NWA for over two decades, Lucas went back to Texas for Southwest Championship Wrestling in 1982. While there, he won two Tag Team Championships with Ricky Morton, whom Lucas trained four years earlier in Tennessee.

American Wrestling Association (1984–1985)
In 1984, Lucas joined the American Wrestling Association in Minneapolis. By this time, Lucas was winding down his career, so he was mainly used as a jobber. After a year with the AWA, Lucas retired after 25 years in the ring.

Retirement and death
After retiring, Lucas became a fixture at the T&W Flea Market, where he would sell hats and other items. He died at home in Pensacola, Florida on August 6, 2014, aged 73.

Championships and accomplishments
Central States Wrestling
NWA Central States Heavyweight Championship (1 time)
NWA World Tag Team Championship (Central States version) (1 time) – with Kevin Sullivan
 Gulf Coast Championship Wrestling
 NWA Alabama Heavyweight Championship (7 times)
 NWA Louisiana Heavyweight Championship (2 times)
 NWA Mississippi Heavyweight Championship (4 times)
 NWA Southern Tag Team Championship (4 times) – with Chris Lucas
 NWA Gulf Coast Tag Team Championship (15 times) – with Bobby Fields, Dennis Hall, Chris Lucas, Don Carson, Mac MacFarland, Johnny West, Mike Boyette, Nick Kozak and Gorgeous George Jr.
NWA Southeastern Tag Team Championship (4 times) - with Kevin Sullivan, Bob Armstrong, and Dizzy Hogan
 NWA Southeastern Heavyweight Championship (10 times)
NWA Southeastern United States Junior Heavyweight Championship (3 times)
NWA United States Tag Team Championship (Gulf Coast version) (4 times) – with Mike Boyette, Johnny West, Bob Kelly and Dennis Hall
 NWA Mid-America
AWA Southern Tag Team Championship (13 times) - with Dennis Hall, Johnny Walker, Billy Robinson, and Ricky Morton
NWA Mid-America Heavyweight Championship (1 time)
NWA Mid-America Tag Team Championship (7 times) - with Frankie Laine, Tommy Rich, Ray Candy, Dutch Mantel, George Gulas, and Ricky Morton
NWA World Tag Team Championship (Mid-America version) (1 time) - with Frankie Laine

References

1940 births
2014 deaths
American male professional wrestlers
20th-century professional wrestlers
Professional wrestlers from Arizona
NWA Florida Tag Team Champions